Republic street or Republic Street may also refer to:

Republic Street, Valletta, street in Valletta, Malta
Republic street, street in Victoria, Gozo, Malta
Rue de la République, street in Lyon, France